Heumann is a German surname. Notable people with the surname include:

Andreas Heumann (born 1946), photographer
Carl Heumann (1886–1945), German art collector
Josef Heumann (born 1964), German ski jumper
Judith Heumann (1947–2023), American disability rights activist
Milton Heumann, American political science professor

See also 
Ute Lotz-Heumann (born 1966), German-American historian
Margot Heuman (born 1928), Holocaust survivor
Humann, surname

German-language surnames